The  is a radiotelephony spelling alphabet, similar in purpose to the NATO/ICAO radiotelephony alphabet, but designed to communicate the Japanese kana syllables rather than Latin letters. The alphabet was sponsored by the now-defunct Ministry for Posts and Telecommunications. 

Each kana is assigned a code word, so that critical combinations of kana (and numbers) can be pronounced and clearly understood by those who transmit and receive voice messages by radio or telephone, especially when the safety of navigation or persons is essential.

There are specific names for kana, numerals, and special characters (i.e. vowel extender, comma, quotation mark, and parentheses).

Kana
For example,  means "ri of ringo". Voiced kana do not have special names of their own. Instead, one simply states the unvoiced form, followed by "ni dakuten". /P/ sounds are named similarly, with "ni handakuten". Thus, to convey , one would say "". To convey , one would say "".

Numerals
Digits are identified with "" (sūji no.../Number X) followed by the name of the number, analogous to English phrases such as the number five.

When a number can be named in multiple ways, the most distinctive pronunciation is used.  Thus 1, 7, 4 are pronounced hito, nana, yon rather than ichi, shichi, shi which could easily be confused with each other.

Special symbols

Sources 
 

Japanese writing system
Spelling alphabets

ja:通話表#和文通話表